Robert Erwin Tanner (September 27, 1907 – December 8, 1997) was an American football player. He played college football for the University of Minnesota and in the National Football League (NFL) as an end and tackle for the Frankford Yellow Jackets in 1930. He appeared in 12 NFL games, eight as a starter.

References

1907 births
1997 deaths
Minnesota Golden Gophers football players
Frankford Yellow Jackets players
Players of American football from Minnesota